Frank Elinam Cobbinah (born 24 December 1983), commonly known by his stage name Atumpan, is a Ghanaian afrobeats and dancehall singer. Cobbinah founded his own record label which signs predominantly Afro beats artists.

Early years and education
Born on 24 December 1983, Cobbinah hails from Avenor in the Volta Region of Ghana and began making music in his early school days. He had his basic education at Yaa Asantewaa M/A primary and junior secondary school at Kumasi in the Ashanti Region and continued to Boa Amponsem senior secondary school in the Central Region of Ghana, where he served as entertainment prefect. In 2002 he was admitted to Wiawso College of Education, where he trained as a professional teacher. In October 2008, he gained admission to the University of Education, Winneba, where he read for a bachelor's degree course in Linguistics, majoring in English Language.

Recognition and musical style

Cobbinah began performing as Atumpan (meaning Talking Drum in the Akan language) in 2011, when he released a major hit called "The Thing".  "The Thing" gained him nominations for Best New Artiste of the year, Best Afro pop Song of the Year, and Best Collaboration of the year in the 2012 Vodafone Ghana Music Awards.

In 2013, he was nominated for Best African Act in the 2013 MOBO Awards and also won the Best International Afrobeats Act in the 2013 BEFFTA Awards.
Cobbinah in 2014 received nomination in the Urban Music Awards for the Best African/Afrobeat Act along with Sarkodie and Fuse ODG

Currently with Hardboy Music, Atumpan's recent hit singles include "Regina"  and "Gimme some more", which feature Samini and Sarkodie respectively.

Awards and nominations

Ghana Music Awards

 "Best New Artist 2012" - Nominee
 "Best New Artist Of The Year" - Nominee
 "Best Collaboration of the Year" - Nominee

BEFFTA Awards
 "Best International Afrobeats Act" - Won

MOBO Awards
 "Best African Act" - Nominee

Urban Music Awards Awards
 "Best African/Afrobeat Act" - WON

Ghana Music Awards UK
 UK-based artist of the year

References 

1983 births
Living people
Ghanaian musicians
University of Education, Winneba alumni